Pavol Kopačka (born 7 August 1974 in Ilava) is a Slovak football midfielder who currently plays for club TJ Vlára Kľúčové .

External links

at kyjov-1-fc.estranky.cz

References

1974 births
Living people
Slovak footballers
Association football midfielders
FK Dubnica players
AS Trenčín players
1. FC Slovácko players
FC Spartak Trnava players
FC Nitra players
Slovak Super Liga players
Czech First League players
Slovak expatriate footballers
Expatriate footballers in Austria
People from Ilava
Sportspeople from the Trenčín Region